Lakeside station may refer to:

 Lakeside MRT station, a rapid transit station in Singapore
Lakeside railway station, Melbourne in Australia
Lakeside railway station, Queensland in Australia
 Lakeside railway station (Cape Town)
 Lakeside railway station (England), a stop on the Lakeside and Haverthwaite Railway, a heritage railway in Cumbria, England